Kelton Head is a hamlet in Cumbria, England. It has just four houses, and is very close to Kelton Head Quarry, near Rowrah. Despite this, it is in the Lamplugh Neighbourhood.

Hamlets in Cumbria
Borough of Copeland